National Bank of Kenya (NBK), also known as National Bank, is a commercial bank in Kenya, the largest economy in the East African Community. It is licensed by the Central Bank of Kenya, the central bank, and national banking regulator. Effective September 2019, the bank is a wholly owned subsidiary of the Kenya Commercial Bank Group.

Overview
NBK is a large financial services provider in Kenya, serving individuals, small-to-medium companies and businesses (SMEs) and large corporations. Headquartered in Nairobi, the bank owns one subsidiary company: NatBank Trustee and Investment Services Limited. , National Bank of Kenya's asset base was valued at approximately US$1.122 billion (KES:115.143 billion), with shareholders' equity valued at about US$67.6 million (KES:6.936 billion). Following the acquisition of the shares of NBK by KCB Group in September 2019, the shares of NBK were de-listed from the Nairobi Securities Exchange on 16 September 2019.

History
The bank was established in 1968 as a 100 percent government-owned financial institution. In 1994, the Kenyan Government reduced its shareholding to 68 percent by selling 32 percent shareholding to the public. The government further divested from NBK over the years, until its present shareholding of 22.5 percent, as of April 2019. Following 12 years of poor financial performance, the bank became profitable again in 2010, paying out an annual dividend ever since.

In April 2019, KCB Bank Kenya Limited, the largest commercial bank in the country by assets, announced its intention to acquire 100 percent of the assets and liabilities of National Bank of Kenya, pending shareholder and regulatory approvals. That acquisition was concluded on 16 September 2019.

Subsidiaries
The bank owns the following subsidiary companies in which it has 100% shareholding
 Natbank Trustee and Investment Services Limited: Nairobi, 
 Kenya National Capital Corporation Limited: Nairobi, 
 NBK Insurance Agency Limited: Nairobi,

Ownership
, the stock of National Bank of Kenya is owned by the Kenya Commercial Bank Group, a large financial conglomerate, with subsidiaries in seven Eastern African countries and total assets of over $7.013 billion, as of October 2019.

At the time of acquisition of NBK, KCB Group stated that it intended to run NBK as a stand-alone subsidiary, for a period of at least two years, after which NBK would be integrated with KCB Bank Kenya Limited.

Governance
In October 2019, KCB Group appointed a new board of directors for its subsidiary National Bank of Kenya. The following are the board members:

 John Nyerere: Chairman
 Paul Russo: Managing Director
 Joshua Oigara: KCB Group CEO & Managing Director
 Julius Karangi
 Stanley Kamau
 Linnet Mirehane
 Jones Makau Nzomo

See also

 Central Bank of Kenya
 Economy of Kenya
 List of banks in Kenya

References

External links
 
 Central Bank of Kenya website
 National Bank Sale To Investor Dropped In New Funding Plan

Banks of Kenya
KCB Group
Companies based in Nairobi
Kenyan companies established in 1968
Banks established in 1968
1968 establishments in Kenya